Slamet Budiyono (born on 15 May 1995), is an Indonesian professional footballer who plays as a winger for Liga 1 club PS Barito Putera.

Career statistics

Club

Honours

Club
PSS Sleman
 Liga 2: 2018
Dewa United
 Liga 2 third place (play-offs): 2021

Individual
 Liga 2 Best XI: 2021

References

External links
 Slamet Budiyono at Soccerway
 Slamet Budiyono at Liga Indonesia

1997 births
Living people
Indonesian footballers
Association football forwards
Sriwijaya F.C. players
PSS Sleman players
Persis Solo players
PSIM Yogyakarta players
PS Barito Putera players
Sportspeople from South Sumatra
Dewa United F.C. players
Liga 1 (Indonesia) players
Liga 2 (Indonesia) players
21st-century Indonesian people